Linda Sorensen is a former women's cricketer for the Denmark national women's cricket team who played one ODIs during the 1990 Women's European Cricket Cup. Appearing against England, she was dismissed without scoring a run in her only batting innings, and did not bowl.

References

Danish women cricketers
Denmark women One Day International cricketers
Living people
Year of birth missing (living people)